Tyrykovo is a rural locality (a village) in Pelshemskoye Rural Settlement, Sokolsky District, Vologda Oblast, Russia. The population was 56 as of 2002.

Geography 
Tyrykovo is located 37 km southeast of Sokol (the district's administrative centre) by road. Mortkino is the nearest rural locality.

References 

Rural localities in Sokolsky District, Vologda Oblast